A helicopter is an aircraft which is lifted and propelled by one or more horizontal rotors.

Helicopter may also refer to:

In music
Helicopters (band), an Australian new wave band of the 1980s
The Helicopters, a South African pop rock band of the 1980s
The Hellacopters, a Swedish garage rock band active from 1994 to 2008
Helicopter (album), a 2009 album by Download

Songs 
"Helicopter" (Bloc Party song), 2004
"Helicopter" (Martin Garrix and Firebeatz song), 2014
"The Helicopter Song", a song by the Irish band the Wolfe Tones
"Helicopter" (CLC song), 2020
"Helicopter", a song by M. Ward from Transfiguration of Vincent (2003)
"Helicopter", a song by the British band The Feeling from Twelve Stops and Home (2006)
"Helicopter", a song by Deerhunter from Halcyon Digest (2010)
"Helicopters", a song by the Barenaked Ladies from Maroon (2000)

In television
"Helicopter", an episode of the television series Drake & Josh
"Helicopter", an episode of the television series Teletubbies

In plants
Helicopter, a Samara fruit falling in spiral
Helicopter tree (Gyrocarpus americanus)

Other uses
 "Helicopter", a style of delivery in Ten-pin bowling
Helicopter parents, a pejorative term for parents who excessively intervene in their children's lives
Helicopters (NZ), a New Zealand-based helicopter operator